Lara Aishah is Malaysian television drama, that is an adaptation of TV Azteca's La Loba produced by Global Station Sdn Bhd.

Cast

2016 Malaysian television series debuts